Charlotte "Sárika" Góth (1900-1992) was a Hungarian-Dutch painter.

Biography
Góth was born on 29 March 1900 in Vienna, Austria to Hungarian parents. Over the course of her lifetime she lived in various parts of Europe including Paris, Budapest, Amsterdam, the Carpathian Mountains region, and Veere. Her teachers included her father, Jo Koster, André Lhote, and Jan Toorop. From 1918 through 1920 she studied at the Akademie van beeldende kunsten (Royal Academy of Art, The Hague). Góth was a member of the Arti et Amicitiae, and Zeeuwse Kunstkring. Góth's work was included in the 1939 exhibition and sale Onze Kunst van Heden (Our Art of Today) at the Rijksmuseum in Amsterdam.

Góth died on 1 April 1992 in Veere.

References

External links
images of Sárika Góth's art on Invaluable

1900 births
1992 deaths
Artists from Vienna
Hungarian women artists
Dutch women artists
20th-century Dutch artists
20th-century Dutch women
Emigrants from the Austro-Hungarian Empire to the Netherlands